This is a list of museums in Honduras.

List 

 Galeria Nacional de Arte (Honduras)
 Honduran Aviation Museum
 Museo Arqueologico de Comayagua
 Museo de Antropología e Historia de San Pedro Sula
 Museo de la Fortaleza de San Fernando de Omoa
 Museo de la Identidad Nacional
 Museo de la Naturaleza (Honduras)
 Museo de las mariposas (Honduras)
 Museo de las telecomunicaciones (Honduras)
 Museo de los Naranjos
 Museo de los Palacios
 Museo de Trujillo
 Museo del Hombre Hondureño
 Museo Numismatico "Rigoberto Borjas"
 Museo Pequeño Sula para la Infancia
 Museo Santa María de los Angeles
 Parque Arqueológico Cuevas de Talgua

External links 
 Listado de museos

Honduras
 
Museums
Honduras
Museums